Paraivongius flavimanus is a species of leaf beetle of Cameroon and the Democratic Republic of the Congo, described by Martin Jacoby in 1903.

Subspecies
There are two subspecies of P. flavimanus:

 Paraivongius flavimanus flavimanus (Jacoby, 1903): The nominotypical subspecies. Found in Cameroon.
 Paraivongius flavimanus scheitzae (Burgeon, 1941): Found in the Democratic Republic of the Congo.

References

Eumolpinae
Insects of Cameroon
Beetles of the Democratic Republic of the Congo
Beetles described in 1903
Taxa named by Martin Jacoby